The 2013–14 Copa del Rey was the 112th staging of the Copa del Rey (including two seasons where two rival editions were played). The competition began on 4 September 2013 and ended on 16 April 2014 with the final. The final took place at Mestalla in Valencia, and saw Real Madrid defeat Barcelona 2–1 to win their 19th title in the competition. The winners assured a place for the group stage of the 2014–15 UEFA Europa League, although Madrid qualified for the 2014–15 UEFA Champions League due to their league performance.

Atlético Madrid were the defending champions, but were eliminated by Real Madrid in the semi-finals, who avenged their 2013 final defeat.

Calendar and format
The next calendar was released by the RFEF on 8 August 2013 and the format was identical to the previous season.

Notes
Double-match rounds enforced away goals rule, single-match rounds did not.
Games ending in a tie were decided in extra time; and if it persisted, by a penalty shootout.
UEFA Europa League qualification: if the Cup winner qualified for the 2014–15 UEFA Champions League, the Cup runner-up would qualify for the third qualifying round, then the 5th and 6th ranked teams in 2013–14 La Liga (always excluding no "UEFA license" and banned clubs) would qualify for group stage and play-off round respectively. However, if the Cup runners-up ended in Europa League places (5th or 6th), the 5th, 6th and 7th ranked teams in 2013–14 La Liga would qualify for group stage, play-off round and third qualifying round respectively.Similarly, if both finalists qualified for the 2014–15 UEFA Champions League, the 5th, 6th and 7th ranked teams in 2013–14 La Liga would also qualify for the group stage, play-off round and third qualifying round respectively.

Qualified teams
The following teams compete in the Copa del Rey 2013–14.

20 teams of 2013–14 La Liga:

Almería
Athletic Bilbao
Atlético Madrid
Barcelona
Betis
Celta Vigo
Elche
Espanyol
Getafe
Granada
Levante
Málaga
Osasuna
Rayo Vallecano
Real Madrid
Real Sociedad
Sevilla
Valencia
Valladolid
Villarreal

20 teams of 2013–14 Segunda División (Barcelona B and Real Madrid Castilla are excluded for being reserve teams):

Alavés
Alcorcón
Córdoba
Deportivo La Coruña
Eibar
Girona
Hércules
Jaén
Las Palmas
Lugo
Mallorca
Mirandés
Murcia
Numancia
Ponferradina
Recreativo
Sabadell
Sporting Gijón
Tenerife
Zaragoza

35 teams of 2013–14 Segunda División B. Teams that qualified are the top five teams of each of the 4 groups (excluding reserve teams), the five with the highest number of points out of the remaining non-reserve teams (*), and the eleven teams winners of a group of 2012–13 Tercera División that were also promoted to Segunda División B:

Albacete
Alcoyano
Algeciras
Amorebieta
Balompédica Linense
Barakaldo
Burgos
Cartagena
Caudal
Écija
El Palo
Fuenlabrada
Gimnàstic
Guadalajara
Huesca
Huracán Valencia
La Hoya Lorca
Laudio
Leganés
L'Hospitalet
Lleida Esportiu
Lucena
Olímpic
Olot
Oviedo
Puerta Bonita
Racing Ferrol
Racing Santander
Real Unión
San Fernando
Sant Andreu
Sariñena
Toledo
Tropezón
Tudelano

8 teams of 2013–14 Tercera División. Teams that qualified are 7 of 18 champions that were not promoted to Segunda División B (or at least the ones with the highest number of points within their group since reserve teams are excluded), and Xerez that was relegated from Segunda División:

Atlético Granadilla
Extremadura UD
Haro Deportivo
Novelda
San Juan
Santa Eulàlia
Tuilla
Xerez

First round
The draw for First and Second round was held on 20 August 2013 at 13:00 CEST in La Ciudad del Fútbol, RFEF headquarters, in Las Rozas, Madrid. In this round gained entry 36 Segunda División B and Tercera División teams. In the draw, firstly seven teams from the 2013–14 Segunda División B received a bye (Fuenlabrada, L'Hospitalet, Lleida, Lucena, Olímpic de Xàtiva, Racing Santander and Tudelano) then remaining teams from 2013–14 Segunda División B and teams from 2013–14 Tercera División faced according to proximity criteria by next groups:

Notes
 (*) Received a bye
 Remaining teams in odd groups faced each other and with proximity criteria if it would be possible.

Matches

Second round
The draw was held together with the First round draw on 20 August 2013 in La Ciudad del Fútbol. In the draw, the team from 2013–14 Segunda División B or 2013–14 Tercera División, winner from First round match Algeciras v Novelda, received a bye. Teams from 2013–14 Segunda División gained entry in this round and faced each other. Winners of First round, together with the seven teams which received a bye, faced each other too.

Matches

Third round
The draw was held on 13 September 2013 at 13:00 CEST in La Ciudad del Fútbol. In the draw, one team from 2013–14 Segunda División B or 2013–14 Tercera División, winner from Second round, which previously didn't receive a bye, received one. Teams from Segunda División faced each other. Remaining winners of Second round and the team which received a bye faced each other. The matches were played on 16 and 17 October 2013.

Matches

Notes
 (*) Sant Andreu received a bye.

Final phase
The draw for the Round of 32 was held on 8 November 2013, in La Ciudad del Fútbol. In this round, all La Liga teams gained entry in the competition.

Round of 32 pairings were as follows: the seven remaining teams participating in Segunda División B and Tercera División faced the La Liga teams which qualified for European competitions, this is: four teams from Pot 1 (Segunda B and Tercera) were drawn against four teams from pot 2a (champions) and the three remaining teams in pot 1 were drawn in the same way with the pot 2b teams (Europa League). The five teams in Pot 3 (Segunda División) were drawn against five teams of the thirteen remaining teams of La Liga (Pot 4). The remaining eight teams of La Liga faced each other. Matches involving teams with different league tiers were played at home on the first leg the team in lower tier. This rule was also applied in Round of 16, but not for the Quarter-finals and Semi-finals, in which the order of legs was pure as of the order of draw.

Bracket

Round of 32

First leg

Second leg

Round of 16

First leg

Second leg

Quarter-finals

First leg

Second leg

Semi-finals

First leg

Second leg

Final

Top goalscorers

See also
 List of Spanish football transfers summer 2013
 2013–14 La Liga
 2013–14 Segunda División
 2013–14 Segunda División B
 2013–14 Tercera División

References

External links

MundoDeportivo.com 
Marca.com 
AS.com 

2013-14
1